Béchar  is the capital city of Béchar Province, Algeria. It is also a commune, coextensive with Béchar District, of Béchar Province. In 2008 the city had a population of 165,627, up from 134,954 in 1998, with an annual growth rate of 2.1%.

 It has then thrived on the activity of the coal mines until petroleum production seized the market.

Leatherwork and jewellery are notable products of Béchar. Dates, vegetables, figs, cereals and almonds are produced near Béchar. There are bituminous coal reserves near Béchar, but they are not exploited to their greatest potential because of transportation costs are too high relative to that from the oil and gas fields of eastern Algeria. The city was once the site of a French Foreign Legion post.

Location

Geography

The rocky highlands of the Djebel Béchar overlook the city from the southeast, reaching  to the east of the city. The northwest, by contrast, is a flat rocky reg.

Climate
Béchar has a hot desert climate (Köppen climate classification BWh), with extremely hot summers and warm winters despite the high elevation. There is very little rain throughout the year, and summers are especially dry.

Economy
Agriculture is an important industry in Béchar. There are a total of 109,000 date palms planted in the commune, occupying . Other crops include vegetables, figs, cereals and almonds. As of 2009 there were 19,067 sheep, 16,664 goats, 1,766 camels, and 444 cattle. There were also 126,000 chickens in 20 buildings.

There is some tourism in the city, with 10 hotels and tourist attractions including sand dunes, palm groves, the old ksar, and an ancient fort.

Other industries in the city include coal mining, and the production of leatherwork and jewellery.

Infrastructure and housing

98% of Béchar's population is connected to drinking water, 95% is connected to the sewerage system, and 99% (including 33,180 houses) have access to electricity. There are 6 fuel service stations in the town.

Béchar has a total of 33,245 houses, of which 25,499 are occupied, giving an occupation rate of 6.5 inhabitants per occupied building.

Transportation
The main road through Béchar is the N6 highway; it connects to Mecheria, Saida, Mascara and Oran to the north, and to Adrar and Timiaouine to the south.

It is served by a narrow gauge railway station of SNTF, which in 2008, may be replaced with a standard gauge railway. From 1941 to 1963 it was reached by the standard gauge Mediterranean-Niger-Railway.

Béchar is served by Boudghene Ben Ali Lotfi Airport,  to the northwest of the city.

Education

The city is home to the University of Béchar.

There are 68 elementary schools in Béchar, with 777 classrooms including 581 in use. There are a total of 33,511 school students.

8.3% of the population has a tertiary education, and another 23.0% has competed secondary education. The overall literacy rate is 86.4%, and is 91.4% among males and 81.4% among females.

Health
Béchar has 2 hospitals, 4 polyclinics, 17-room care facilities, a maternity ward, 36 private pharmacies, 5 medical operating theatres, and a psychiatric service.

Culture
Béchar has a cinema with 850 seats, as well as a museum.

Religion
Béchar has 27 operational mosques, with another 19 under construction.

Historical population

Localities
The commune is composed of 8 localities:

Béchar Centre
Debdaba
Béchar Djedid
Ouakda
Benzireg
Hassi Haouari
Zouzfana
Gharassa
Manouarar Nekheila

See also

 Railway stations in Algeria

References

External links

Official website of Béchar Province

Communes of Béchar Province
Cities in Algeria
Province seats of Algeria